Bap-Tizum is a 1972 live album by the Art Ensemble of Chicago recorded at the Ann Arbor Blues and Jazz Festival held at the Otis Spann Memorial Field and first released on the Atlantic label in 1973. It features performances by Lester Bowie, Joseph Jarman, Roscoe Mitchell, Malachi Favors Maghostut and Don Moye.

Reception
Rolling Stone's Bob Palmer wrote "Bap-Tizum features dozens of instruments (all the saxophones from soprano to bass, tempered and non-tepered percussion, etc.) and sequences of colours and moods which range from energy-raising to reflection to explosive anger to sheer soul strutting... The performance gassed ten thousand people, most of whom had never heard of the group, and Atlantic is to be commended for releasing it in all its rough hard-edged grandeur."

The Allmusic review by Richard S. Ginell awarded the album 5 stars noting that "the Art Ensemble holds back nothing in a chaotic, meandering, exasperating, outrageous -- and, thus, always fascinating -- performance".

Critic Michael G. Nastos calls the album "essential".  Author Rafi Zabor describes the album as a "riotous" real-life analogue to his depiction of a fictional, tumultuous Art Ensemble performance in The Bear Comes Home.

Track listing 
 "Nfamoudou-Boudougou" (Moye) - 4:16
 "Immm" (Favors) - 5:31
 "Unanka" (Mitchell) - 10:44
 "Oouffnoon" (Mitchell) - 3:25
 "Ohnedaruth" (Art Ensemble of Chicago) - 15:00
 "Odwalla" (Mitchell) - 5:42
Recorded September 9, 1972 at the Ann Arbor Blues and Jazz Festival, Michigan

Personnel 
Lester Bowie: trumpet, percussion instruments
Malachi Favors Maghostut: bass, percussion instruments, vocals
Joseph Jarman: saxophones, clarinets, percussion instruments
Roscoe Mitchell: saxophones, clarinets, flute, percussion instruments
Don Moye: drums, percussion

References 

Art Ensemble of Chicago live albums
1972 live albums
Atlantic Records live albums